Franklin High School is a public high school located in Franklin, Massachusetts, United States.

Clubs and activities
A variety of clubs and extracurricular activities are offered:

 Academic Decathlon (ACADEC)
 Alzheimer's Awareness Club
 American Sign Language Club
 Art Club
 Best Buddies
 Chamber Music Club
 Chess Club
 Classics Club
 Community Service
 Computer Club
 Connect 4 Cancer
 DECA
 Diversity Awareness Club
 Drama and annual Musical
 Empty Bowls Club
 FHS Creative (formerly Photography Club)
 Future Physicians & Medical Scientists
 Girl UP
 Girls Who Code
 GIVE
 Green Team
 Happiness Club (40% Club)
 Honor Societies (National, Art, French, Latin, Music, Science, Spanish)
 International Club
 Math Club
 Mirage Literacy Magazine
 Mock Trial
 Model Congress
 Music Production Club
 Musical Theater
 Oskey Production
 Pantherbook Newspaper Club
 Peer Leadership
 Robotics
 SADD
 Science Olympiad Club
 Sexuality & Gender Awareness Club (SAGA)
 Ski & Board Club
 Student Government
 TV Club
 Ultimate Frisbee
 World of Difference
 Yearbook
 Young Democrats
 Young Investors Society
 Young Republicans

Athletics

 Mascot: Panthers
 League: Hockomock

Accomplishments
 Girls' soccer - MIAA Division 1 South Sectional Champions - 2010, MIAA Division 1 State Champions - 2012
Boys Ice Hockey won State championships in 1983 and 2016

Boy Baseball won State championships in 1986 and 2018

Sports by season:

Fall
 Cheerleading
 Cross country
 Field hockey
 Football
 Golf
 Boys' soccer
 Girls' soccer
 Volleyball
Winter
 Boys' basketball
 Girls' basketball
 Cheerleading
 Boys' ice hockey 
 Girls' ice hockey
 Curling
 Indoor track
 Skiing
 Boys' swimming
 Girls' swimming
 Wrestling
Spring
 Baseball
 Girls' lacrosse
 Boys' lacrosse
 Softball
 Boys' tennis
 Girls' tennis
 Boys' track
 Girls' track

Music and performing arts

The FHS Music Department is a part of the Massachusetts Music Educator's Association Central District (CD-MMEA) and sends several students to join the senior festival every year. It is also a part of the Massachusetts Instrumental & Choral Conductors Association (MICCA), where all ensembles participate in their respective annual festivals. The Jazz Band participates in their own separate festival.

Musical ensembles:
 String Orchestra
 Symphony Orchestra
 Concert Band 
 Wind Ensemble
 Chorus 
 Chamber Chorus
 Treble Chorus
 Jazz Band
 Jazz Combo
 Jazz Trio
 Pep Band 

Annual performances, music:
 All home varsity football games
 Pep Rally 
 Thanksgiving Day Game 
 Two varsity basketball games
 Memorial Day
 Winter Concert
 Spring Concert
 MICCA
 Jazz Nights
 Pops Night 
 Graduation

Annual performances, drama:
 Cabaret 
 Fall Play
 Lovefest 
 DramaFest
 Spring Musical
 OSKEY 

Previous school plays and musicals:

*canceled due to the COVID-19 pandemic''.

Specialized programs
Franklin Arts Academy (FAA): An alternate course pathway, the FAA enables students that are accepted into the program to take courses only available to FAA students, requiring an art component as part of the application. The courses include FAA versions of regular English, history, and some science classes, as well FAA art courses. The FAA also holds fundraisers to go on one field trip a year to a performance and/or museum. Students can join beginning in their sophomore year, applying as a freshman. All fine arts students, including both the performing and visual arts, are able to join.

Senior Project: As a participant in Senior Project, students will increase their awareness of the necessary steps for achieving a set career, service, or artistic path by participating in a full-time externship during the final quarter of their senior year. Students will complete various project objectives including: 70 hours of professional externship experience, written reflection papers, a cumulative portfolio, and a final presentation to a panel. Students must submit a proposal for Senior Project by the end of their junior year. The proposal is reviewed by a panel who will determine if the Project had the potential to be completed successfully. Upon acceptance into the Senior Project, students will enroll in a preparatory course during the 3rd term of their senior year and then commence their externship during the final quarter of their senior year. Senior Project provides students with the opportunity to apply their academic, social, and civic skills developed throughout the course of their experiences at FHS and realize connections between their high school education and future careers.

Notable alumni

 Peter Laviolette, Class of 1982, former NHL player and NHL head coach
 Pat Mason, Class of 1993, former head baseball coach at Virginia Tech
 Jen O'Malley Dillon, Class of 1994, White House deputy chief of staff and campaign manager
 Kristi Kirshe, Class of 2013, Olympian on US Women's Rugby team at the 2020 Tokyo Summer Olympics
 Paula Lodi
 Maria Barrett

References

External links

Schools in Norfolk County, Massachusetts
Public high schools in Massachusetts
Hockomock League